Archie Taylor may refer to:

Archie Taylor (footballer, born 1882) (1882 – ?), Scottish footballer who won the FA Cup in 1912
Archie Taylor (footballer, born 1939) (born 1939), English footballer
Archie Taylor (footballer) in 1904 FA Cup Final
Archie Taylor (sport shooter) (1869-1939), British sports shooter

See also
Archibald Taylor (disambiguation)